Bayanteeg is a coal mining settlement in Nariinteel sum (district) of Övörkhangai Province in southern Mongolia. Bayanteeg population is 1249

References

Populated places in Mongolia